The New Cambridge Modern History replaced the original Cambridge Modern History in an entirely new project with all new editors and contributors. It was published by Cambridge University Press in fourteen volumes between the 1950s and the 1970s. It included a wide range of new scholarship on traditional themes as well as more coverage of science, technology, political ideas, the arts, intellectual history, and the art of warfare.  The Shifting Balance of World Forces 1898–1945 brought the chronology down to 1945.  The chair of the editorial board was Sir George Norman Clark.
The New Cambridge Modern History has been described as "a comprehensive examination of the political, economic, social, and cultural development of the world from 1493 to 1945".

The final volume is a new Historical atlas. Some volumes have appeared in revised editions.

Volumes published

I. The Renaissance, 1493–1520 (1957)

George Richard Potter & Denys Hay, eds.
 Hans Baron, chapter 3, 'Fifteenth-century civilisation and the Renaissance'
 Rudolf Wittkower, 'The Arts in Western Europe: Italy' (pp. 127–153)
 Leopold Ettlinger, 'The Arts in Western Europe: Northern Europe' (pp. 153–165)
 Harold Lawton, 'The Arts in Western Europe: Vernacular Literature in Western Europe'

II. The Reformation, 1520–1559 (1958, new ed. 1990)

Geoffrey Rudolph Elton, ed.

III. The Counter-Reformation and price revolution, 1559–1610 (1968)

R. B. Wernham, ed.

IV. The Decline of Spain and the Thirty Years War 1609–48/59 (1970)

J. P. Cooper, ed.
 Roland Mousnier, 'French Institutions and Society, 1610–1661'

V. The Ascendancy of France 1648-88 (1961)

F. L. Carsten

VI. The rise of Great Britain and Russia, 1688–1715/25 (1970)

J. S. Bromley, ed.

VII. The Old Regime, 1713–1763 (1957, new ed. 1996)

J. O. Lindsay, ed.

VIII. The American and French Revolutions 1763–93 (1965)

A. Goodwin

IX. War and peace in an age of upheaval, 1793-1830 (1965)

Charles William Crawley, ed.

X. The zenith of European power 1830–70 (1960)

J. P. T. Bury, ed.
 Michael Lewis, 'Armed Forces and the Art of War, 1830–1870'

XI. Material Progress and World-Wide Problems 1870–1898 (1962)

F. H. Hinsley

XII. The Shifting Balance of World Forces 1898–1945 (second edition, The Era of Violence (1968)

C. L. Mowat

XIII. Companion Volume (1979)

Peter Burke

XIV. Atlas (1970)

H. C. Darby & Harold Fullard,

References

External links
 New Cambridge Modern History

History books about the late modern period
Cambridge University Press books
Series of history books